Halit Haluk Babacan (born 20 April 1966) is a Turkish sailor. He competed in the Finn event at the 1988 Summer Olympics.

References

1966 births
Living people
Turkish male sailors (sport)
Olympic sailors of Turkey
Sailors at the 1988 Summer Olympics – Finn
Place of birth missing (living people)
20th-century Turkish people